Zarya is a rural locality (a settlement) and the administrative center of Zarinsky Selsoviet, Biysky District, Altai Krai, Russia. The population was 970 as of 2013. There are 9 streets.

Geography 
Zarya is located 8 km north of Biysk (the district's administrative centre) by road. Studenchesky is the nearest rural locality.

References 

Rural localities in Biysky District